Emil Axelsson may refer to:

 Emil Axelsson (ice hockey) (born 1986), Swedish ice hockey
 Emil Axelsson (co-driver) (born 1983), Swedish rally co-driver